Umerkot District (Dhatki: عمرکوٹ / عمرڪوٽ), also known as Amarkot District, is a district in the Sindh province of Pakistan. The city of Umerkot is the capital of the district. Sindhi is the native language of approximately 93.4% of the residents according to the 2017 Pakistan Census. Umerkot is the only non-Muslim majority district in Pakistan, with adherents of Hinduism representing 52.2% of the total population.

History
Akbar was born in Umerkot Fort when his father Humayun was fleeing from the Suris. After the 1843 invasion by Charles Napier, Sindh was divided into provinces and was assigned a Zamindars, also known as Wadaras, to collect taxes for the British.

Administration

The district is administratively subdivided into the following Tehsils:
 Kunri
 Pithoro
 Samaro
 Umarkot

Demographics

At the time of the 2017 census, Umerkot district had a population of 1,073,469, of which 243,537 (22.69%) lived in urban areas. Umerkot had a sex ratio of 929 females per 1000 males and a literacy rate of 35.07%: 48.36% for males and 20.87% for females.

Religion

Umerkot is the only Hindu majority district in Pakistan. Hindus form around 51% and Muslims form around 48% of Umerkot's population. In 1965, about 80% of the district's population were Hindus and 20% were Muslims. The Hindu population declined due to the migration of Hindus to India. Muslims are in the majority only in Pithoro taluk.

The Umarkot Shiv Mandir in Umerkot is one of the oldest and most sacred Hindu temples in the Sindh. The annual Maha Shivratri celebration of the temple is one of the biggest religious festivals in Pakistan and is attended by around 250,000 people.

Languages

At the time of the 2017 census, 93.43% of the population spoke Sindhi, 3.02% Punjabi and 1.80% Urdu as their first language. The main dialect of the region is Dhatki, although most people record their language as 'Sindhi'.

List of Dehs
The following is a list of Umerkot District's dehs, organised by taluka:

See also 
 Umarkot Shiv Mandir
 Dhatki language

References

 
Districts of Pakistan
Districts of Sindh
Hinduism in Sindh